Oleg Petrovich Korolyov is a Russian politician. He served as the Head of Administration of Lipetsk Oblast in Russia between 1998 and 2018. 
He became a member of the federation council in 1996. He was elected with a declared result of more than 70% of the votes cast. He was reelected with a declared result of more than 70% of the votes cast in 2002. His administration has garnered praise for the authorities' treatment of its Jewish minority. Korolev met with chief rabbi of Lipetsk Shaul Adam on February 2, 2006; the rabbi reported on local radio that there had been no Antisemitic incidents in Lipetsk Oblast.

External links
  Official gubernatorial website
   Supporters of the governor

Communist Party of the Soviet Union members
Living people
Heads of Lipetsk Oblast
1952 births
United Russia politicians
Saratov State Agrarian University alumni
Members of the Federation Council of Russia (1996–2000)
Members of the Federation Council of Russia (after 2000)